Annetta North is a town in eastern Parker County, Texas, United States, on FM 5. The population was 518 at the 2010 census.

The Town of Annetta North split from Annetta and was incorporated on August 11, 1979. Phyllis M. Studer was elected as its first mayor.  the mayor is Robert Schmidt.

Annetta North is a small town that is mostly residential and farmland. There is only one church building, and the only other public places in the town are a car repair shop and riding arena. Both the Clear Fork and the South Fork of the Trinity River pass through the town, as well as Burgess Creek and the Dixon Branch. O'Neal Cemetery is located within the town limits as well.

Geography

Annetta North is located at  (32.720231, –97.680992).

Demographics

2020 census

As of the 2020 United States census, there were 554 people, 167 households, and 132 families residing in the town.

2000 census
At the 2000 census, there were 467 people, 164 households and 140 families residing in the town. The population density was 140.1 per square mile (54.1/km2). There were 172 housing units at an average density of 51.6 per square mile (19.9/km2). The racial makeup of the town was 98.93% White, 0.43% Native American, 0.21% from other races, and 0.43% from two or more races. Hispanic or Latino of any race were 1.93% of the population.

There were 164 households, of which 41.5% had children under the age of 18 living with them, 78.7% were married couples living together, 4.9% had a female householder with no husband present, and 14.6% were non-families. 12.2% of all households were made up of individuals, and 2.4% had someone living alone who was 65 years of age or older. The average household size was 2.85 and the average family size was 3.11.

27.6% of the population were under the age of 18, 4.9% from 18 to 24, 25.5% from 25 to 44, 29.6% from 45 to 64, and 12.4% who were 65 years of age or older. The median age was 41 years. For every 100 females, there were 100.4 males. For every 100 females age 18 and over, there were 94.3 males.

The median household income was $68,750 and the median family income was $76,604. Males had a median income of $57,500 compared with $22,500 for females. The per capita income for the town was $36,091. About 1.6% of families and 0.9% of the population were below the poverty line, including none of those under age 18 and 2.7% of those age 65 or over.

Climate 
Annetta North has a wet and subtropical climate, with an annual average temperature of 64 °F. Annetta North also has an average high of 76 °F, and a low of 51 °F. The annual precipitation average is 33.1", while the average snowfall is 0.216".

Education
Annetta North is served by the Aledo and Weatherford Independent School Districts.

References

External links
 AnnettaNorth.com – The official website of the Town of Annetta North

Dallas–Fort Worth metroplex
Towns in Parker County, Texas
Towns in Texas